To fillet in the sense of literary editing is a form of censorship or redaction effected by "cutting out" central letters of a word or name, as if the skeleton of a fish, and replacing them with dashes, to prevent full disclosure (e.g.  for "William Pitt"). It was frequently practiced in publications of the 18th century in England. Its purpose was to inform interested readers in an obfuscated manner whilst at the same time avoiding the risk of being sued for illegal publication or defamation or libel by the overt naming of persons as having committed certain acts or spoken certain words.

It was often performed not to avoid legal action but merely to show deference to the privacy of some great personage, or not to offend his or her imputed sense of modesty by naming him or her as the author of some great or worthy deed or act.

References

Censorship
Self-censorship